Gilles Vincent (born 11 September 1958, Issy-les-Moulineaux) is a French-language writer, author of detective novels, a collection of short stories, a novel and  two thrillers for adolescents.

Works 
2012: Parjures, Jigal Polar
2013: Djebel, Jigal Polar
2013: Beso de la muerte, Jigal Polar, Cezam Prix Littéraire Inter CE 2014.
2014:Trois heures avant l'aube, Jigal Polar
2015: Hyenae, Jigal Polar
2016: 1,2,3...sommeil! Cairn éditions, Detective novel in the series "Du Noir au Sud".
Sad Sunday obtained the Prix Marseillais du Polar 2010.

2011: Les essuie-glaces fatigués rendent les routes incertaines, short stories, Eaux-Fortes
2011: Flamencos, éditions Gascogne
2014: Gévaudan, le retour de la Bête.
2015: Jack l’Éventreur, le retour

References

External links 
 Gilles Vincent on Éditions Jigal
 Gilles Vincent on Babelio
 Entretien avec l’auteur Gilles Vincent
 Hyenae de Gilles Vincent

21st-century French non-fiction writers
French crime fiction writers
1958 births
People from Issy-les-Moulineaux
Living people